Augstein is a surname. Notable people with the surname include:

Jakob Augstein (born 1967), German journalist and publisher, son of Rudolf
Rudolf Augstein (1923–2002), German journalist, founder of Der Spiegel magazine

German-language surnames
German magazine publishing families